Charlie Siringo's West: An Interpretive Biography is a biography of former Pinkerton Detective Charlie Siringo, by historian Howard R. Lamar. It was published by the University of New Mexico Press in 2005.

In addition to its purely biographical theme, the book examines Siringo's life in the context of the Pinkerton agency's descent into illegality, and the increasing romanticisation of "Wild West" characters by a fast-growing Hollywood film industry of the 1920s.

The book won the 2006 Bronze Wrangler award for nonfiction from the National Cowboy and Western Heritage Museum.

Editions
Albuquerque, NM: University of New Mexico Press, 2005 ,

References

American biographies
History books about the American Old West
2005 non-fiction books
University of New Mexico Press books